The 1930 Appalachian State Mountaineers football team was an American football team that represented Appalachian State Teachers College (now known as Appalachian State University) as an independent during the 1930 college football season. In their second year under head coach C. B. Johnston, the Mountaineers compiled an overall record of 8–2–1.

Schedule

References

Appalachian State
Appalachian State Mountaineers football seasons
Appalachian State Mountaineers football